Nanyang railway station ( is a first-class railway station in Nanyang, Henan, China on the Nanjing–Xi'an railway and Jiaozuo–Liuzhou railway operated byt China Railway Zhengzhou Group.

History
The station was built in 1970. In May 2017, work began on rebuilding the station. The existing station building was demolished and a new building constructed. The rebuilt station opened on 26 December 2018. A West Square expansion is planned.

See also
 Nanyang East railway station

References 

Railway stations in Henan
Railway stations in China opened in 1970